Edge of Thorns is the seventh album by American heavy metal band Savatage, released on April 6, 1993 on Atlantic Records. This is the last Savatage album to feature guitarist Criss Oliva, who died six months after its release, and their first release with Zachary Stevens on lead vocals, following the departure of Jon Oliva from his role as singer in Savatage, although he did produce and write songs for the album.

The drums on this album sound different from other Savatage records, as Steve "Doc" Wacholz decided to use electronic drums. Although most of the drum kits sound authentic, a difference in the timbre of the toms can be heard.

"All That I Bleed" and "Miles Away" were the last songs Jon Oliva, Criss Oliva and the producer Paul O'Neill wrote together. For that, they are still Jon Oliva's two favorites on the album.

The woman in the picture of the album art is Dawn Oliva, Criss Oliva's wife. Gary Smith, who also did the front and back covers for Hall of the Mountain King, the front cover for Gutter Ballet, the back cover for Streets, and all of Criss Oliva's airbrushed guitars, painted the cover. The face in the trees is supposed to be Jon Oliva, though producer O'Neill disputes that despite its publication in a Criss Oliva interview from 1993. The cover is supposed to represent good (the woman) vs. evil (the face in the trees). According to Criss Oliva in a 1993 interview, "The girl is surrounded by fear and innocence. But the face in the trees is evil. Everything around her is evil. It's about good and evil. The songs on the CD reflect this, too."

The opening piano riff to the title track was used extensively in the MTV reality series The Real World: San Francisco during scenes involving the hospitalization of Pedro Zamora.

Reception

In a contemporary review for Rock Hard magazine, where Edge of Thorns had been elected Album of the Month, Matthias Breusch wrote that Savatage had "not lost a pinch of their compositional potential and energy" and praised Criss Oliva's guitar playing; he complimented new singer Zak Stevens' "powerful, energetic voice", which was "cleverly adapted to the melodic lines" of the new songs, although he missed Jon Oliva's "crazy screams".

Modern reviews are generally positive. AllMusic Geoff Orens praised Savatage's continuous experimentation of new sounds and wrote that Edge of Thorns moved away from the progressive metal of the two previous albums, being a "leaner, more understated guitar-driven record", with the majority of the songs consisting "of stripped-down metal anthems, recorded with less flashy guitar work and production" than before. In his opinion, the new material fits well the "less bombastic delivery" of new singer Stevens, who does "not have the emotional range that Oliva showed on Gutter Ballet and Streets". Canadian journalist Martin Popoff remarked how Edge of Thorns was "a raucous return to old Savatage vein", with "mountains of thirsty power riffs" and "an odd adherence to a goth past", mostly out of fashion in the alternative metal scene of the time. He was more critical of "the band's mellow tendencies" and the murky long intros to the songs.

Track listing
All music composed by Criss Oliva, Jon Oliva and Paul O'Neill. All lyrics written by Paul O'Neill and Jon Oliva.

Personnel
Savatage
Zachary Stevens – lead vocals
Criss Oliva – guitars, co-producer
Johnny Lee Middleton – bass
Steve "Doc" Wacholz – drums (electronic drums, studio only)

Additional musicians
Jon Oliva – piano, keyboards, drums on tracks "He Carves His Stone" and "Degrees of Sanity" (studio only), co-producer
Andy James – drums (touring member only)
Wes Garren – rhythm guitar and keyboards (touring member only)

Production
Paul O'Neill – producer
Jim Morris, Tom Morris – engineers at Morrisound Studios
Joe Daley, Mark Prator – assistant engineers at Morrisound Studios
Scott Burns, Judd Packer, Noah Baron, Tim Hatfield – additional engineering in New York
Brian Benscoter, Brian Malone, Claire Iwahashi, Dave Wehner, Jeff McDonald, Joe Davi, Martin Yee, Rick Miller, Shawn Malone, Steve Heritage – assistant engineers in New York
Greg Calbi – mastering at Sterling Sound, New York

Charts

Album

Songs

References 

1993 albums
Savatage albums
Atlantic Records albums
Albums produced by Paul O'Neill (rock producer)
Albums recorded at Morrisound Recording